Buckingham District  (District 19) is a municipal district in the city of Gatineau, Quebec. It is represented on Gatineau City Council by Edmond Leclerc.

The district consists of the former city of Buckingham, in Gatineau's far east end.

Councillors
Jocelyne Houle (2002-2009)
Maxime Pedneaud-Jobin (2009-2013)
Martin Lajeunesse, Action Gatineau (2013–2021)
Edmond Leclerc (2021–present)

Election results

2001

2005

2009

2013

2017

2021

References

Districts of Gatineau